San Juan Betulia is a town and municipality located in the Sucre Department, northern Colombia.

References
 Gobernacion de Sucre - San Juan Betulia

Sucre